The Omaha Scoular Building is a five-story commercial use building located in the Park East neighborhood of Downtown Omaha, Nebraska. It was designed by LEO A DALY in 1924 for the Knights of Columbus and was completed in 1927. The building was first renovated in The early 1970' by Northern Natural Gas Co/Internorth-when the building was restored--the olympic sized pool and gym were restored, the entrance was moved from the south side of Dodge Street to the west side of the building, and office space changes were made throughout.   The original ballroom was changed to an auditorium--and with the changes to the entrance, the original cornerstone was opened and reviewed.  This building served Northern Natural Gas/Internorth thru 1987 at which time, the Company relocated to Houston, Texas as Enron.  The changes outlined following in this writeup were not the original renovations and the above information should be noted as being correct.....
-1988, when a new glass lobby with marble staircase was added. Other features that were added in the 1988 renovation included new corporate offices, new tenant space, a trading floor, and a full service ballroom. A private health club that includes a track, 25-yard indoor pool, and exercise room was added to the lower floor. Renovations were again done in 2006 to the 3 floors the Scoular Company occupies.

References

External links
 Alley Poyer Architects
 The Scoular Company Website
 Lund-Ross Constructors
 Pinnacle Club Omaha

Buildings and structures completed in 1925
Buildings and structures in Omaha, Nebraska